This is a list of the first minority male lawyer(s) and judge(s) in Vermont. It includes the year in which the men were admitted to practice law (in parentheses). Also included are those who achieved other distinctions, such becoming the first in their state to graduate from law school or become a political figure.

Firsts in Vermont's history

Lawyers 
 First Italian American male: Joseph J. Frattini (1917) 
 First African American male: Samuel Johnson (c. 1980s)

State judge 

 First Jewish American male: Myron Samuelson in 1941

See also 
 List of first minority male lawyers and judges in the United States

Other topics of interest 

 List of first women lawyers and judges in the United States
 List of first women lawyers and judges in Vermont

References 

 
Minority, Vermont, first
Minority, Vermont, first
Lawyers and judges
Vermont lawyers
History of Vermont